The Queen's Theatre (originally Queen's Hall) is a theatre building in Burslem, Stoke-on-Trent, England. It is situated in Wedgwood Street in the town centre.

It is a Grade II listed building, listed on 19 April 1972.

History
It was commissioned as Burslem's town hall, to replace the town hall built in the 1850s, and was built by the architects Russell and Cooper. Completed in 1911, after the Federation of Stoke-on-Trent in 1910 made its original purpose obsolete, the building was opened as the Queen's Theatre, a venue for drama, concerts and other entertainments.

Requiring repairs, the theatre closed in 1998. From 2003 events occasionally took place; it closed again in 2014.

Architecture
The front, faced with ashlar, has a portico of full height with three pairs of Corinthian columns and an entablature above; there is a windowless attic storey above this. There is  a large doorway between each pair of columns.

To the right of the main frontage is a wing of the building, of two storeys, with ten windows on each storey and an entrance. It is supposed that this part, being less ornate, was created after it was known that the building was no longer intended as a town hall.

The foyer has a white marble staircase at each end. The auditorium has a rear and side balconies, and a ceiling with decorative plasterwork and large Art Deco lamps.

References

Buildings and structures in Stoke-on-Trent
Grade II listed buildings in Staffordshire
Theatres in Staffordshire